The Nebelhorn  is a  mountain in the Allgäu Alps in Germany, near the village of Oberstdorf. It lends its name to the Nebelhorn Trophy figure skating competition and the Nebelhorn Classics a freeride race event. Also the Nine Knights freeski contest takes place just above the "Höfatsblick" station of the Nebelhornbahn.

Its summit is a well-known viewing point, from where there is a view far into the Alpine massif.

The summit area of the Nebelhorn may be climbed via the Hindelang Klettersteig; it should only be attempted with special equipment (a 'Klettersteig set').

Gallery

External links 
 http://www.nebelhorn.de/

Mountains of Bavaria
Allgäu Alps
Mountains of the Alps